US Post Office-Tonawanda is a historic post office building located at Tonawanda in Erie County, New York, United States. It was designed and built 1939–1940, and is one of a number of post offices in New York State designed by the Office of the Supervising Architect of the Treasury Department under Louis A. Simon.  The building is in the Colonial Revival style and features a central pavilion crowned by a cupola and flanked by end pavilions with gable roofs.  The interior once featured a mural by Symeon Shimin, but it was removed and has disappeared.  An addition to the north was added in 1964.

It was listed on the National Register of Historic Places in 1989.

References

External links
US Post Office-Tonawanda - U.S. National Register of Historic Places on Waymarking.com

Tonawanda
Government buildings completed in 1940
Colonial Revival architecture in New York (state)
Tonawanda
National Register of Historic Places in Erie County, New York